Peter Sharp (born 1954) is an Australian professional rugby league coach. Peter Sharp or Sharpe may also refer to:

Peter Sharp (cricketer) (1939–2012), New Zealand cricketer
Peter Sharp (artist) (born 1964), Australian artist
Peter Sharpe, (1777–1842), American politician
Peter Sharpe (cricketer) (born 1944), English cricketer

See also
Peter Jay Sharp Theater (disambiguation)